Saini Simona is a Tuvaluan civil servant, Director of Women Affairs in Tuvalu. In 2010 she spoke out in support of a proposal to have seats reserved for women in the Parliament of Tuvalu.

References

Year of birth missing (living people)
Living people
Tuvaluan civil servants
Place of birth missing (living people)
Tuvaluan women in politics